Georgios Lazaridis (born 23 July 1983) is a Greek professional footballer.

Career
Lazaridis began his professional football career by joining Veria in July 2005.

References

External links
Onsports.gr Profile

1983 births
Living people
Greek footballers
Veria F.C. players
Kavala F.C. players
Platanias F.C. players
Panachaiki F.C. players
AO Chania F.C. players
Association football goalkeepers
Footballers from Naousa, Imathia